The Score is a 1978 Swedish crime film, based on the Kennet Ahl (Lasse Strömstedt/Christer Dahl) novel with the same name. The film deals with different themes such as drug addiction, institutionalisation, and the Swedish criminal justice system. This was Peter Stormare's screen debut.

Plot
Kennet, a drug addict and incorrigible petty criminal, longs to even 'the score', which is not in his favour.

Cast
Anders Lönnbro as Kennet Ahl, the main protagonist.
Bodil Mårtensson as Karin Åberg
Carl-Axel Heiknert as Oskar Åberg, Karin's father
Siv Ericks as Linnéa Åberg, Karin's mother
Pale Olofsson as "Varan"
Roland Janson as "Eleganten"
Weiron Holmberg as Curt Storm
Sten Ljunggren as "Bromsbandet"
Roland Hedlund as "Sundsvalls-Jesus"
Lasse Strömstedt as Douglas Andersson
Bo Högberg as "Roten"
Lena Lindgren as Vera Lind
Anders Granström as Piketen leader
Bernt Ström as Union leader
Peter Stormare as a prisoner

Accolades
Anders Lönnbro won the award for Best Actor at the 14th Guldbagge Awards for his role as Kennet Ahl.

References

External links
 

1978 films
1978 crime drama films
Films about drugs
1970s prison drama films
Swedish crime drama films
1970s Swedish-language films
1970s Swedish films